For the Cool in You is the third studio album by American R&B musician and songwriter Babyface. The album was released on August 24, 1993. The album reached number sixteen on the US Billboard 200 and at number two on the Top R&B Albums chart. The album spawned five singles, the lead single (and title track) "For the Cool in You" (US No. 81, R&B No. 10), "Never Keeping Secrets" (US No. 15, R&B No. 3), "And Our Feelings" (US No. 21, R&B No. 7), "Rock Bottom", and "When Can I See You" which became his biggest (and third) top-ten hit on the Billboard Hot 100, peaking at number four, and reaching number six on the Hot R&B Singles chart.

The album received a nomination in the category of Best Male R&B Vocal Performance at the 37th Grammy Awards. On January 29, 1997, the album was certified 3× Platinum by the Recording Industry Association of America (RIAA).

Track listing

"Well Alright" was originally released on the Poetic Justice soundtrack album, June 1993.

Personnel
Credits adapted from liner notes.

 Lead vocals, backing vocals, keyboards, bass guitar, executive producer – Babyface
 Background vocals – Anthony Kemp, Daryl Simmons, After 7
 Skins (Drum programming) – L.A. Reid
 Bottom (bass) – Kayo
 Saxophone – Larry Jackson
 MIDI programming – Donald Parks, Randy Walker
 Recording engineers – Jim Zumpano, Brad Gilderman
 Assistant engineers – John Frye, Lori Fumar, Steve Warner, Kevin Becks, Milton Chan, Eduardo Correa, Kimm James, Jason Shablik, Ray Silva, Thom Russo
 Mixing – Dave Way, Barney Perkins
 Mastering – Herb Powers, Jr.
 Production coordinator – Ivy Skoff
 Art direction – Marc Bennett Studio
 Photography – Rick Day
 Stylists – Bernard Jacobs, Anthony Mitchell

Charts

Weekly charts

Year-end charts

Certifications

References

Babyface (musician) albums
1993 albums
Albums produced by L.A. Reid
Albums produced by Babyface (musician)